Conservation park may refer to:

Conservation park (Australia)
Conservation parks of New Zealand
Protected area, also called a conservation area